UoIF Matteuspojkarna is a sports club in Stockholm, Sweden.

History
The club was founded on May 15, 1915. The ice hockey club took part in the Elitserien, then the top level Swedish league, from 1932 to 1935. They then played in its successor league, the Svenska Serien in the 1936-37 and 1942-43 seasons. From 1946 to 1950, and in 1951-52 and 1956-57, Matteuspojkarna played in the top-level Swedish Division I. From 1929 to 1950, the club regularly competed in the single-elimination Swedish Championship. They finished as runner-up in 1948, losing to IK Göta 3–2 in overtime.

The handball department competed in the Swedish men's team handball top division during the 1968–69 season. It currently plays in Division 3.

External links
 Official website  
 Team profile on eurohockey.com

Ice hockey teams in Sweden
Swedish handball clubs
Sporting clubs in Stockholm
1915 establishments in Sweden
Sports clubs established in 1915
Ice hockey teams in Stockholm County
Multi-sport clubs in Sweden